Hesperia comma, the silver-spotted skipper or common branded skipper, is a butterfly of the family Hesperiidae. It is known as silver-spotted skipper in Europe and common branded skipper in North America where the butterfly Epargyreus clarus, a spread-winged skipper, also has the common name of "silver-spotted skipper".

Appearance, behaviour and distribution
Often confused with the large skipper Ochlodes venata, this species is easily distinguished by the numerous white spots on the underside hindwings, and the tips of the upper forewings tend to be darker than those of the large skipper. Also their flight periods rarely overlap; in Britain the large skipper has all but finished when the silver-spotted takes to the wing in August. The silver-spotted skipper prefers warm calcareous sites and has a wide distribution as far south as North Africa, northwards throughout Europe to the Arctic and eastwards across Asia to China and Japan. It also has subspecies in North America. In the UK it is rare and restricted to chalk downlands of southern England.

Subspecies
 Hesperia comma benuncas (Oberthur 1912)
 Hesperia comma borealis Lindsey 1942 – Labrador branded skipper
 Hesperia comma catena (Staudinger 1861)
 Hesperia comma colorado (Scudder 1874)
 Hesperia comma dimila (Moore 1874)
 Hesperia comma hulbirti Lindsey 1939 – Hulbirt's branded skipper
 Hesperia comma laurentina (Lyman 1892) – Laurentian branded skipper
 Hesperia comma lena Korshunov & P. Gorbunov 1995
 Hesperia comma manitoba (Scudder 1874) – Manitoba branded skipper
 Hesperia comma mixta Alpheraky 1881
 Hesperia comma pallida Staudinger 1901
 Hesperia comma planula Korshunov 1995
 Hesperia comma shandura Evans 1949
 Hesperia comma sushinki Korshunov 1995

Life cycle and foodplants
Females lay single eggs during August and September on the leaf blades of sheep's fescue Festuca ovina, the only foodplant, and occasionally on nearby plants. The females are very fussy where they lay; most eggs in the UK are laid in short turf, up to 4 cm, and often next to patches of bare ground. This species overwinters as an egg and hatches in March. Like other skippers the larvae construct small tent-like structures from leaf blades and silk from which to feed. They enter the pupal stage after 14 to 15 weeks at the base of the foodplant. Pupation takes 10 to 14 days, and as with most butterflies the males emerge first.

Recent resurgence in the UK
Concerted conservation efforts in the UK, backed by government agencies, have seen this once-threatened species thriving in certain areas. Numbers have increased by some 1500% over the last twenty years; the number of sites has increased from just 68, with 202 new sites established. Conservation schemes have focussed on providing the silver-spotted skipper with suitable habitats, with positive results.

See also
 List of butterflies of Great Britain
 List of butterflies of Canada

References and external links

Barnett LK and Warren MS. Species action plan. Silver-spotted Skipper Hesperia comma. Butterfly conservation October 1995.
Captain's European Butterfly guide 
Hesperia comma page The Butterflies of Norway site]
Cirrus Digital Imaging Silver-spotted skipper aka Epargyreus clarus: reference photographs - North America
Jim Asher et al. The Millennium Atlas of Butterflies of Britain and Ireland Oxford University Press
Article from The Times, 15 May 2006
The Butterfly Monitoring Scheme
 Butterfly Conservation Armenia

comma
Butterflies described in 1758
Butterflies of Africa
Butterflies of Asia
Butterflies of Europe
Butterflies of North America
Taxa named by Carl Linnaeus